Petrella is an Italian surname, and may refer to:

 Bob Petrella (born 1944), American football player
 Clara Petrella (1914–1987), Italian operatic soprano
 Errico Petrella (1813–1877), Italian opera composer
 Gianluca Petrella, Italian jazz trombonist
 Ian Petrella (born 1974), American actor and puppeteer
 Ivan Petrella (born 1969), Argentine social theorist
 Marina Petrella (born 1954) a former member of Red Brigades
 Patrick Petrella, a fictional Spanish-English police detective created by Michael Gilbert
 Riccardo Petrella (born 1941), Italian political scientist and economist
 Vito Petrella (born 1965), Italian sprinter

See also 
 Petrella (disambiguation)